Nora Kirilova Dimitrova (born 26 July 1996) is a Bulgarian footballer who plays as a defender for Women's National Championship club FC NSA Sofia and the Bulgaria women's national team.

International career
Dimitrova capped for Bulgaria at senior level in a 0–6 friendly loss to Croatia on 14 June 2019.

References

1996 births
Living people
Women's association football defenders
Bulgarian women's footballers
Bulgaria women's international footballers
FC NSA Sofia players